The 22nd Australian Film Institute Awards ceremony, presented by the Australian Film Institute (AFI), honoured the best Australian feature films of 1980, and took place on 17 September 1980 at Regent Theatre, in Sydney, New South Wales.  The ceremony was hosted by Graham Kennedy and televised in Australia on ABC.

Breaker Morant was nominated for thirteen awards and won ten, in all categories it was nominated for, including Best Film and Best Direction for Bruce Beresford. Other winners with two were Hard Knocks, and Manganinnie and ...Maybe This Time with one.

When the Australian Film Institute established the Australian Academy of Cinema and Television Arts (AACTA) in 2011, the awards became known as the AACTA Awards.

Winners and nominees
The nominees were announced on 29 August 1980. Breaker Morant received 13 nominations across ten feature film award categories, winning all ten categories it was nominated for including: Best Film, Best Direction for Bruce Beresford, Best Actor for Jack Thompson, Best Supporting Actor for Bryan Brown and Best Screenplay for Jonathan Hardy, David Stevens, Bruce Beresford. Stir received ten nominations in the same categories but walked away with none. The only other winners in the feature film categories was Tracy Mann for Best Actress, for Hard Knocks; Jury Prize for Hard Knocks; Jill Perryman for Best Supporting Actress, for ...Maybe This Time; and Peter Sculthorpe for Best Original Music Score, for Manganinnie.

Non-feature films were awarded with a prize at the awards, but are considered the best in their categories by the Australian Academy of Cinema and Television Arts (AACTA). Although Bird of the Thunder Woman is considered the winner of the Best Cinematography – Documentary category, it was the recipient of a "silver prize" at the awards, while No Such a Place, also a finalist in the category, was presented with a "bronze prize".

Special awards
Raymond Longford Award
Tim Burstall
Jury Prize
Hard Knocks – Don McLennan

See also
AACTA Awards

References

Further reading

External links
The Australian Academy of Cinema and Television Arts Official website

Film
A
1980 in Australian cinema